DeLeón Tequila is a brand of the alcoholic beverage tequila. It is certified as 100% blue Weber agave tequila. DeLeón is produced in the town of Purísima del Rincón in the Mexican state of Guanajuato. The city name literally translates to "Purest of the Corner" and the town is named after the Immaculate Conception. The brand was founded by Brent Hocking in 2008 and purchased in 2013 by Sean "Puff Daddy" Combs and the beverages giant Diageo as equal ownership partners.

History

DeLeón Tequila was founded by Brent Hocking in 2008. It was first introduced to the U.S. market on Cinco de Mayo 2009. DeLeón Tequila does not use any of the four allowed additives (glycerin, sucrose, oak extract and caramel) that are permitted under Mexican tequila regulations.
In December 2013 it was announced that Sean "Puff Daddy" Combs would become a partner of DeLeón Tequila following the success of his work with the Cîroc vodka brand. A few weeks later it emerged that Combs had in fact co-purchased DeLeón Tequila in partnership with Diageo, with whom he had worked with on growing Cîroc. Following the purchase Diageo and Combs each assumed 50% ownership of DeLeón Tequila.

Varieties

Blanco: The DeLeón Blanco is named "Diamante" which translates to diamond in Spanish.
Reposado: Reposado translates to resting and is known as the "quiet tequila" in Mexico.
Añejo: The DeLeón Añejo is blended in French Sauternes wine barrels.
Extra Añejo: The DeLeón Extra Añejo is the first and only "cask-strength" 102-proof tequila. Release date August 1, 2011.
Leóna: This reserve is made from 100% pure blue Weber agave and uses Mexican water drawn from DeLeón's three natural spring wells. The tequila is distilled in the white glove facility of the DeLeón fabrica, then aged 34 months in Sauternes wine barrels. Presented in a limited edition black box with a python flask. Leóna retails for $825.00 (750 ML. 40% alcohol / VOL. 80 Proof).

Awards

DeLeón Diamante – Best in Show Grand Prize Winner at the 2009–2010 world's largest beverage competition held in Genevé, Switzerland, known as the World Beverage Competition. The judges quote, "A whole new class of tequila has been realized." 
DeLeón Reposado – Best in Show Grand Prize Winner at the 2009–2010 world's largest beverage competition held in Genevé, Switzerland, known as the World Beverage Competition. The judges quote, "A whole new class of tequila has been realized." 
DeLeón Añejo – Best in Show Grand Prize Winner at the 2010–2011 world's largest beverage competition held in Genevé, Switzerland, known as the World Beverage Competition. 
DeLeón Añejo – Robb Report Best of the Best Grand Prize Winner 2011.
DeLeón Extra Añejo - Robb Report Best of the Best Grand Prize Winner 2012.
DeLeón Leóna - Robb Report Best of the Best Grand Prize Winner 2013. DeLeón Tequila is the only spirits brand in the 25-year history of Robb Report to win "Best Spirit" three years in a row.

Taste

DeLeón Diamante: "Clean nose, and I mean cleeeeean. Unadulterated agave, citrus, and cinnamon with maybe a hint of nuttiness ... Gentle, delicate, and graceful."
DeLeón Reposado: "This pale-colored tequila--aged eight months in oak barrels--greets the palate in a smooth, elegant, and balanced fashion, with flavors of apple, roasted agave, and pepper. Drinks best neat from a white-wine glass."
DeLeón Añejo: “ … the deep amber-gold hue of the DeLeón Añejo is the result of the 17 months spent in new French oak, plus further aging in barrels formerly used for Château d’Yquem ... The result is a Cognac-like texture enveloped by a subtle throaty purr reminiscent of an Aston Martin V8 Vantage. This is one añejo best sipped from a snifter after dinner.”
DeLeón Extra Añejo: "Despite its concentration, this tequila has no sting of alcohol to its aroma: Only a slight tingling on the tongue hints at the lofty proof. Honey, buttered almonds, cherries, and cedar essences are packed into every sip, while a hint of heather, reminiscent of a single-malt Scotch, lingers at the back of the palate."
Leóna: “Matured in Château d'Yquem barrels for 34 months—just two months shy of the time required to become an extra-añejo—this limited-edition, bronze-hued tequila possesses a texture more akin to an XO Cognac, brimming with burnt orange peels, cherries, and a hint of rose petals.”

References

External links
 DeLeón Tequila: A new level of Luxury in Tequila

Tequila
Alcoholic drink brands